The 2001 FIVB Volleyball Men's World Grand Champions Cup was held in Nagoya and Tokyo, Japan from 20 to 25 November 2001.

Qualification

Competition formula
The competition formula of the 2001 Men's World Grand Champions Cup was the single Round-Robin system. Each team plays once against each of the 5 remaining teams. Points were accumulated during the whole tournament, and the final standing was determined by the total points gained.

Squads

Venues
 Nagoya Rainbow Hall, Nagoya, Japan
 Tokyo Metropolitan Gymnasium, Tokyo, Japan

Results
All times are Japan Standard Time (UTC+09:00).

|}

Nagoya round

|}

Tokyo round

|}

Final standing

Team Roster
Leonel Marshall, Jorge Luis Hernandez, Iván Ruíz, Ángel Dennis, Pavel Pimienta, Maikel Salas, Raidel Poey, Ramón Gato, Alain Roca, Ihosvany Hernández, Yosenki García, Yasser Romero
Head Coach: Gilberto Herrera

Awards
MVP:  Ivan Miljković
Best Scorer:  Ivan Miljković
Best Spiker:  Kim Sang-woo
Best Blocker:  Andrija Gerić
Best Server:  Ángel Dennis
Best Digger:  Katsutoshi Tsumagari
Best Setter:  Alain Roca
Best Receiver:  Vasa Mijić

External links
Official website

FIVB Volleyball Men's World Grand Champions Cup
World Grand Champions Cup
FIVB Men's World Grand Champions cup
V